Brenthia ardens is a species of moth of the family Choreutidae. It was described by Edward Meyrick in 1912. It is found in Assam, India.

References

Brenthia
Moths described in 1912
Moths of Asia